Kanem may refer to:
 Kanem–Bornu Empire, existed in modern Chad and Nigeria known to Arabian geographers from the 9th century AD onward and lasted as the independent kingdom of Bornu until 1900
 Kanem Prefecture, of former prefectures of Chad
 Kanem Region, a region of Chad created in 2002 from the former Prefecture of Kanem
 Kanem Department, one of three departments which make up the Kanem Region in Chad
 Kanem, a historic Chinese county which is now part of the Dongfang City in Hainan Province, China